The Federation of Journalists of Iraq (Arabic: (IJS)نقابة الصحفيين العراقيين) is a journalists association in Iraq founded on 11 June 1969. It was formed out of several local associations and unions that were formed by journalists in provinces such as Baghdad.Its current President is "Moaid Allami"(Arabic: مؤيد اللامي).

See also
International Federation of Journalists

References

External links
Official website
President Moaid Allami (Arabic: مؤيد اللامي)

Iraqi journalism organizations
1969 establishments in Iraq